WECV is a radio station operated by Bott Radio Network, with a Christian talk/teaching format.

Until 2011, the station was owned by Trevecca Nazarene University, and played Contemporary Christian music.

A key figure in the station's history is former General Manager David Deese. Deese, who still teaches at the university, led the radio station as a student, then as a faculty member. He was able to increase the station's transmission power on a couple of occasions and helped the university purchase 760 AM WENO and later put WNRZ, a repeater at 91.5 MHz in Dickson, on the air.

WECV is simulcast on WNRZ (covering western Middle Tennessee) and translator stations on 93.9 in Gallatin and 99.5 in Clarksville. 
In the fall of 2010, Trevecca Nazarene University announced the sale of WNAZ, WNRZ and its translator stations to Bott Radio Network. On February 18, 2011 at noon, the station was transferred to Bott, at which time it began airing Bott Radio Network programming. The WNAZ call letters were officially changed to WECV several days later.

Translators

External links

ECV
Bott Radio Network stations
ECV